The Slovak Cycling Federation or SZC (in Slovak: Slovenský Zväz Cyklistiky) is the national governing body of cycle racing in Slovakia.

The SZC is a member of the UCI and the UEC.

External links
 Slovak Cycling Federation official website

National members of the European Cycling Union
Cycling
Cycle racing in Slovakia